The 1995 All-Africa Games football tournament was the 6th edition of the African Games men's football tournament. The football tournament was held in Harare, Zimbabwe between 12–23 September 1995 as part of the 1995 All-Africa Games.

Qualified teams

The following countries have qualified for the final tournament:

Squads

Final tournament
All times given as local time (UTC+2)

Group stage

Group 1

Group 2

Knockout stage

Seventh place match

Fifth place match

Semifinals

Third place match

Final

Final ranking

External links
All-African Games 1995 - rsssf.com

 
1995
1995 All-Africa Games
All-Africa Games